The Lady in Question is a 1940 American comedy-drama romance film directed by Charles Vidor and starring Brian Aherne, Rita Hayworth and Glenn Ford.

This was the first of five films in which Glenn Ford and Rita Hayworth appeared together, most famously in their second film, Gilda (1946). They also teamed together in The Loves of Carmen (1948), Affair in Trinidad (1952) and The Money Trap (1965). Their off-screen liaisons were soon transformed into an enduring, lifelong friendship.

Plot
While serving on a Paris jury André Morestan (Brian Aherne) persuades his deadlocked peers to vote for the acquittal of Natalie Roguin (Rita Hayworth), a young woman on trial for the death of a young man she had been seeing. Securing her acquittal, Morestan invites her to live and work at his bicycle and music shop when no one else will give her a job. However, he decides to keep her true identity a secret, which soon begins to raise doubts within his family. His son (Glenn Ford) soon falls in love with her, even though he knows who she is.

Eventually, Pierre steals some money from the store's till, and André is persuaded by a fellow former juror that Natalie was in fact guilty. He goes to the authorities, but learns from them that new evidence has turned up that completely exonerates her.  All are reconciled and love wins out.

Cast
 Brian Aherne as André Morestan
 Rita Hayworth as Natalie Roguin
 Glenn Ford as Pierre Morestan
 Irene Rich as Michèle Morestan
 George Coulouris as Defense Attorney
 Lloyd Corrigan as Prosecuting Attorney
 Evelyn Keyes as Françoise Morestan
 Edward Norris as Robert LaCoste
 Curt Bois as Henri Lurette
 Frank Reicher as President
 Sumner Getchell as Fat Boy
 Nicholas Bela as Nicolas Farkas

References

External links
 
 
 
 
 The Lady in Question at TV Guide (slightly shortened version of 1987 write-up originally published in The Motion Picture Guide)

1940 comedy-drama films
American comedy-drama films
American remakes of French films
Columbia Pictures films
Films directed by Charles Vidor
Films set in France
Films set in Paris
Juries in fiction
American black-and-white films
1940 films
1940s American films
1940s English-language films